AustriaN Newspapers Online (ANNO) is a project run by the Austrian National Library (Österreichische Nationalbibliothek) for the conservation of historic newspapers, whereby particularly important and popular newspapers are scanned in and made available on the Internet. By the end of 2009 ANNO had about 4.76 million digitized pages.

Digitalised newspapers 
The range of papers is constantly being expanded.

Literature 
 ANNO – AustriaN Newspapers Online. A digitisation initiative of the Austrian National Library. Ein Vortrag bei der Postkonferenz "Newspapers and the press in Central and Eastern Europe: access and preservation" bei der 69. IFLA Konferenz im August 2003 in Berlin. Präsentation (Powerpoint, 1,2 MB; deutsch)
 Massendigitalisierung von Bibliotheksbeständen. Allgemeines am Beispiel „ANNO – AustriaN Newspapers Online“ – einer Initiative der Österreichischen Nationalbibliothek. Ein Vortrag von Wilhelm Dikovich und Christa Müller am 28. Österreichischen Bibliothekartag in Linz am 22. September 2004. (Präsentation (Powerpoint, 0,9 MB; deutsch)

External links 
 ANNO (AustriaN Newspapers Online)
 ANNO-Suche (Full Text Search in ANNO)
 Rezension des Projektes In: Der Tagesspiegel

References 

Austrian culture
Online databases
Mass media in Austria